Saba Ahmed (born January 11, 1985) is a Pakistani-American political activist, lawyer, and engineer. She is the founder and president of the Republican Muslim Coalition, former lawyer at the United States Patent and Trademark Office, and former engineer at Intel. She has urged Muslim Americans to vote Republican. She supports Donald Trump, but has said she is "deeply hurt by [his] ignorant views of Islam."

Biography
She was born in Rawalpindi, Pakistan, moved to America when she was 12, and then grew up in Oregon.

She came to public attention as a friend of the family of Mohamed Osman Mohamud, convicted for his attempt to bomb a Christmas tree lighting in Portland, Oregon. Ahmed was interviewed by the press. She posited that he may have been "framed."

In January 2011, she was in the local news because her family said she was missing, but she was actually safe in California. At that time her family claimed she was diagnosed with a mental disorder, but Ahmed has denied that. In 2011, she ran for U.S. Congress as a Democrat.

In 2014 she published an essay in The Guardian, explaining that she had become a Republican in 2014 because she believes her Islamic pro-life, pro-traditional family, pro-business, pro-trade values are aligned with GOP. In June 2014, at a Heritage Foundation panel on the Benghazi attacks she was taunted by Brigitte Gabriel after asking about their portrayal of all Muslims as bad. In 2015, she made headlines for wearing an American flag hijab on Fox News. She was discussing Trump's comment that he would consider shutting down certain radical mosques after a series of terrorist attacks in Paris. She invited Trump to go to a mosque.

Election history

References

External links
 

Living people
21st-century United States government officials
21st-century American lawyers
American Muslims
Portland State University alumni
Intel people
Pakistani emigrants to the United States
People from Rawalpindi
Oregon Democrats
United States Department of Commerce officials
Washington, D.C., Republicans
1985 births